Scollay is a surname. Notable people with the surname include:

Fred J. Scollay (1923–2015), American actor 
Gabrielle Scollay (born 1989), Australian actress
Leonard Scollay (1973–2014), Shetland fiddle player
Tom Scollay (born 1987), Australian cricketer
William Scollay (1756–1809), American developer and militia officer